The 2014–15 Arkansas–Pine Bluff Golden Lions men's basketball team represented the University of Arkansas at Pine Bluff during the 2014–15 NCAA Division I men's basketball season. The Golden Lions, led by seventh year head coach George Ivory, played their home games at the K. L. Johnson Complex and were members of the Southwestern Athletic Conference. They finished the season 12–20, 9–9 in SWAC play to finish in a tie for fifth place. The team did not participate in the SWAC tournament due to a postseason ban issued by the NCAA.

Roster

Schedule

|-
!colspan=9 style="background:#000000; color:#FFD700;"| Regular season

References

Arkansas–Pine Bluff Golden Lions men's basketball seasons
Arkansas-Pine Bluff
Arkansas-Pine Bluff Golden Lions men's basketball
Arkansas-Pine Bluff Golden Lions men's basketball